The Ferdinando Marinelli Artistic Foundry (Fonderia Artistica Ferdinando Marinelli also known as FAFM) is one of the last remaining Florentine foundries, producing works in bronze utilizing the Renaissance technique of lost-wax. A large number of bronze sculptures produced in Florence over the last century come from this artistic foundry. One of the most famous and popular works in Florence, the 'La Fontana del Porcellino', was cast by the Marinelli Foundry in 1988 and replaced the antique in 1998.

As early as 1929, Marinelli Foundry was present internationally. It produced the monumental sculpture ‘La Carretta dei Pioneri’ (‘The Pioneer’s Cart’) carved by the Uruguayan artist José Belloni. It may still be seen today in Montevideo. In 1932, the panels of the immense Bramante Staircase at the entrance of the Vatican Museums by  Antonio Maraini were cast. A more recent achievement is the ‘Warrior on horseback’ at the Macedonia Square in Skopje, North Macedonia, inaugurated in 2011 and the work of the sculptor  Valentina Stevanovska.

History 

The history of the Fonderia Artistica Ferdinando Marinelli begins in 1905 with the opening of a small shop on Florence’s Via de’ Giudei (today’s Via Ramaglianti) by Ferdinando Marinelli. Born in Piegaro, in the Province of Perugia in 1887, he arrived as a teenager in Florence where he was apprenticed first to Cusmano Vignali’s foundry and subsequently to Gabellini’s, learning the techniques of both stirrup manufacturing as well as lost-wax casting. In 1915, he was employed by the Fonderia of Alessandro Biagiotti (Biagiotti’s nickname was ‘Brucino’).
After World War I, Ferdinando took over the Gabellini foundry on Via del Romito (today’s Via Filippo Corridoni). During this period, the Marinelli Foundry produced several monuments which commemorate the fallen of  World War I; those on Piazza Dalmatia in Florence and Poggio a Caiano, (both by Mario Moschi) as well as those at Barberino Val d’Elsa and Cerbaia, (works by Odo Franceschi). In 1925, the Foundry executed the monument to the painter Giovanni Fattori donated to the city of Livorno by Valmore Gemignani.
Two years later, the Chamber of Commerce, Florence surveyed the artisan workshops in the Province and reported that: «The reputation of the Marinelli Foundry […] rests on the perfection of its casting, employing an acid based varnish permitting the metal to be displayed without losing any of its glare, maintaining warm tonalities, those of natural bronze thereby creating works of art».

In 1927, Fonderia Artistica Ferdinando Marinelli cast a sculptural group measuring in total 22 meters made by the Uruguayan José Belloni for Montevideo, ‘La Carretta dei Pionieri’ (‘The Pioneer’s Cart’) commissioned by the Consul Gilberto Fraschetti. Marinelli Foundry received important commissions thanks to the esteem with which Ferdinando was held by the sculptor Antonio Maraini. Maraini choose him as his caster when he received the commission from Pope Pius XI to execute the panels that decorate the newly built large staircase at the entrance to the Vatican Museums.

The Foundry’s expansion continued and shortly prior to the outbreak of World War II, industrial castings and metal refining were added to its traditional artistic activities and indeed remained an important part of its output until the end of the conflict. In 1945, Ferdinando Marinelli leaves the Foundry to his sons Aldo and Marino who carry on the artistic traditions. Upon Marino’s death, the company passes on to his son Ferdinando Jr. who maintains the ancient tradition of lost-wax casting. Marinelli Foundry remains to this day one of the last artistic workshops practicing this technique and a benchmark for Italian artisan excellence.

In addition to important commissions received from foreign governments and private collectors, the Foundry produced on behalf of the City of Florence, a bronze posthumously of the ‘Porcellino’ by Pietro Tacca in the Loggia del Mercato Nuovo. The antique work was moved to the Museo Bardini in 2004. In addition, again for Florence, it executed posthumously of  Giambologna's 'Bacchus' in Borgo San Jacopo (antique is, from 2006, in the Bargello Museum), and the ‘St. Matthew’ by Lorenzo Ghiberti for an external niche of the Church of Orsanmichele (antique in museum nearby).

Headquarters 

The Ferdinando Marinelli Artistic Foundry remained in its historical headquarters in Via Corridoni until 2001 when new environmental regulations prohibiting the casting of bronze within Florence forced the company to build new headquarters in the town of Barberino Val d’Elsa. The new workshops were equipped with up to date furnaces and kilns however leaving all of the traditional production phases unaltered.

The collaboration with the Vatican City 

As already mentioned, the esteem of Antonio Maraini permitted the Marinelli Foundry to establish a working relationship with the Vatican State. After casting the friezes of the monumental staircase entrance to the Vatican Museums, the Foundry produced the tomb and the death mask (the latter in silver) of Pope Pius XI commissioned to the artist Antonio Berti, and the ‘Porta Santa’ (Holy Door) of St. Peter’s Basilica carved by Maestro Vico Consorti. Such collaborations subsequently permitted Marinelli to receive additional commissions from churches in Rome. These include the central doors of the Basilica of Santa Maria Maggiore, after the drawings of Ludovico Pogliaghi, and in 1951, the doors of Sant’Eugenio designed by the engineer Enrico Galeazzi. The collaboration has continued recently; it has produced the bronze handrail of the new large flight of stairs at the Vatican Museums inaugurated in 2000 by Pope John Paul II.

The Diploma of Honor ('Diploma d'Onore') and the horse Sacrifice 

The ‘Diploma d’Onore’ was awarded to the Marinelli Foundry by the Italian Ministry of Trade and Industry in recognition for the casting of Sacrifice one of the four allegorical horses that decorate the Arlington Memorial Bridge of Washington, D.C. The monument is the work of the American sculptor, Leo Friedlander. This project, conceived in the late twenties and delayed due to the Great Depression, was resumed in 1938 and only completed at the end of World War II. The monument was a gift of Ambassador Alberto Tarchiani on behalf of Italy. Its inauguration took place on December 26, 1951.

The most important castings 
A selection of the most important works and monuments executed by the Ferdinando Marinelli Artistic Foundry.

See also 
Firenze
Porcellino
Pietro Bazzanti e Figlio Art Gallery

Notes

Bibliography 

General Information
The Marinelli Foundry of Florence by John Spike http://begeeart.com/the-marinelli-foundry-of-florence/ Last visit 01/07/2014 
https://web.archive.org/web/20140218210035/http://www.loveforitaly.it/simboli/siamo-andati-a-trovare-ferdinando-marinelli visited on 01/07/2014

Associations e Foundations
http://www.unioneimpresestoriche.com/associati_dett.asp?lingua=_ita&idlink=3&idass=41 , visited on 01/07/2014
http://www.fondazioneartigianato.it/fonderia-artistica-marinelli.html Fondazione Firenze Artigianato Artistico, visited on 01/07/2014

The Statue 'Warriors on Horseback'
http://www.unioneimpresestoriche.com/news_dett.asp?lingua=_ita&idnews=174&idlink=6 "A Skopje c'è un Alessandro Magno della Fonderia Artistica Marinelli", visited on 01/07/2014
http://it.peacereporter.net/articolo/29062/Macedonia,+posata+la+statua+di+Alessandro+Magno.+Polemiche+ad+Atene Visited on 12/30/2013
http://www.eastjournal.net/macedonia-cosa-resta-di-alessandro-il-grande-la-statua-che-fa-arrabbiare-atene/8370 Visited on 01/07/2014
http://www.ilgiornaledelfriuli.net/cron/skopje-svetta-la-statua-di-alessandro-magno-a-cavalloil-monumento-e-stato-realizzato-dalla-fonderia-artistica-ferdinando-marinelli-di-firenze-per-53-milioni-di-euro Visited on 01/07/2014
http://cavallomagazine.quotidiano.net/cavallomagazine/2011/06/21/528950-alessandro_bucefalo.shtml Visited on 01/07/2014
http://www.tuttosport.com/attualita/esteri/2011/06/21-131347/Macedonia%3A+mega-statua+Alessandro+Magno Visited on 01/07/2014
http://www.blitzquotidiano.it/cronaca-italia/macedonia-la-statua-di-alessandro-magno-in-piazza-skopje-896075/ Visited on 01/07/2014
http://www.ilquotidianoitaliano.it/gallerie/2011/06/news/macedonia-mega-monumento-ad-alessandro-magno-94976.html/ Visited on 01/07/2014
https://web.archive.org/web/20140221213953/http://www.ilnuovo.it/articolo-20110621-Macedonia%3A_mega-statua_Alessandro_Magno.php Visited on 01/07/2014

Restoration of the Replica of 'Porcellino'
http://press.comune.fi.it/hcm/hcm5353-11_89-Porcellino,+torna+a+splendere+il+bronzo+alla+Loggi.html?cm_id_details=59283&id_padre=47009 Porcellino, torna a splendere il bronzo alla Loggia del Mercato nuovo, consulted on 01/07/2014
http://www.sassarinotizie.com/24ore-articolo-55845-firenze__porcellino__della_loggia_del_mercato_nuovo_e__tornato_a_splendere.aspx Consulted on 01/07/2014
http://corrierefiorentino.corriere.it/firenze/notizie/arte_e_cultura/2011/18-ottobre-2011/porcellino-come-nuovo-tutti-sfregare-1901864171499.shtml Consulted on 01/07/2014

Replica of Michelangelo's 'Bruges Madonna'
https://web.archive.org/web/20140107210226/http://michelangelosmadonna.com/bruges/Rassegna_stampa_HR_web.pdf Consulted on 01/07/2014
http://www.chiesacattolica.it/cci_new_v3/allegati/7636/b292810ago1.pdf Rivive il bronzo 'perduto' di Michelangelo, visited on 01/07/2014
http://www.prnewswire.com/news-releases/michelangelos-bruges-madonna-graces-dc-basilica-70271322.html Visited on 01/07/2014
http://www.zoomedia.it/Firenze/eventi/casa_buonarroti/madonna_di_bruges/index.html Visited on 01/07/2014
http://www.catholicherald.com/stories/Michelangelos-Mother-of-God,12081 Visited on 01/07/2014
Knights Columbus Museum http://www.kofcmuseum.org/km/en/exhibits/2010/michelangelo/ Visited on 01/07/2014

Exhibitions
Bronzi di Toscana di Piero Bertelli http://www.consiglio.regione.toscana.it/upload/crt/eventi/M/titolo_993.pdf Consulted on 01/07/2014
Bronzi di Toscana di Piero Bertelli https://web.archive.org/web/20140107210517/http://www.firenzeonline.com/news/ultim-ora/mostre-lamore-di-piero-bertelli-per-la-forma.html Visited on 01/07/2014
Bronzi di Toscana di Piero Bertelli http://archivio.gonews.it/articolo_219987_Per-Piero-Bertelli-da-Montelupo-una-mostra-in-consiglio-regionale.html Visited on 01/07/2014
Di Bronzo e di Fuoco https://web.archive.org/web/20140107205124/http://www.agenziaaise.it/cultura/istitaliani-di-cultura/156209-qdi-bronzo-e-di-fuocoq-le-sculture-della-fonderia-marinelli-in-trasferta-a-los-angeles.html Consulted on 01/07/2014
Bronzi per Michelangelo https://web.archive.org/web/20140107204023/http://www.fashiondesignlab.com/02/bronzi_michelangelo_a_casa_buonarroti.asp Consulted on 01/07/2014
Bronzi per Michelangelo http://www.repubblica.it/speciali/arte/recensioni/2010/12/10/news/michelangelo_replicato_in_bronzo_una_favolosa_tourne_negli_usa-10046363/ Visited on 01/07/2014
Bronzi per Michelangelo http://www.casabuonarroti.it/it/2010/11/10/bronzi-per-michelangelo/ Consulted on 01/07/2014
Bronzi per Michelangelo http://www.exibart.com/profilo/eventiV2.asp?idelemento=97962 Consulted on 01/07/2014
Monumental Sculpture from Renaissance Florence: Ghiberti, Nanni di Banco and Verrocchio at Orsanmichele http://www.opificiodellepietredure.it/index.php?it/522/mostre Consulted on 01/07/2014
Pietà di Michelangelo a Casa Buonarroti http://www.lanazione.it/firenze/2007/04/10/4255-casa_buonarroti.shtml Visited on 01/07/2014
Pietà di Michelangelo a Casa Buonarroti http://www.artearti.net/magazine/articolo/La_replica_della_Pieta Visited on 01/07/2014
Giuseppe negli arazzi di Pontormo e Bronzino http://www.quirinale.it/qrnw/statico/artecultura/mostre/2010_Giuseppe/immagini-htm/battistero.htm Visited on 01/07/2014
Pietà di Michelangelo a Wally Findlay Galleries http://www.palmbeachdailynews.com/news/entertainment/arts-theater/pieta-replica-centerpiece-of-wally-findlays-madonn/nMFDb/ Visited on 01/07/2014
Pietà di Michelangelo a St. Patrick's Old Cathedral NYC  Visited on 01/07/2014

External links 
Articolo di pacereporter del 21/06/2011

Foundries
Metal companies of Italy
Companies based in Florence
Italian companies established in 1822
Manufacturing companies established in 1822